is an independent Japanese politician serving in the House of Representatives. Noma was a member of the People's New Party before the party dissolved.

References

Living people
1958 births
People's Life Party politicians
Members of the House of Representatives (Japan)